This article lists the rulers of Tyrconnell (Irish: Tír Ċonaıll), a medieval Irish kingdom which covered much of what is now County Donegal.

Oral history
It was founded in the fifth century by a son of Niall of the Nine Hostages, Conall Gulban, of whom the Cenél Conaill are descended. They ruled the kingdom until the Flight of the Earls in September 1607, which marked the end of the kingdom.

Early Chiefs of Cenél Conaill

 Conall Gulban mac Néill  (died 464)
.......
 Ninnid mac Dauach (flourished 544-563)
 Ainmuire mac Sétnai (died 569)
 Báetán mac Ninneda (died 586). 
 Áed mac Ainmuirech (died 598)
 Conall Cú mac Áedo (died 604)
 Máel Coba mac Áedo (died 615)
 Domnall mac Áedo (died 642) 
 Conall Cóel  mac Máele Coba (died 654)
 Cellach mac Máele Coba (died 658)
 ......
 Loingsech mac Óengusso (died 703)
 Congal Cennmagair mac Fergusa (died 710)
 Flaithbertach mac Loingsig (died 765)
 Áed Muinderg mac Flaithbertaig (died 747)
 Loingsech mac Flaithbertaig (died 754) 
 Murchad mac Flaithbertaig (died 767)
 Domnall mac Áeda Muindeirg (died 804)
 Máel Bresail mac Murchada (died 819)
 Ruaidrí ua Canannáin (died 950)

Kings of Tyrconnell (Rí Thír Chonaill) from c. 1201 to 1608
 Eneas MacDaly (Eigneachan mac Dalach), 1201-1207
 Donall Mor MacEneas (Domhnall Mór mac Eicnechain), 1207-1241
 Melaghlin O'Donnell, 1241–1247
 Goffraid O'Donnell, 1247-1258
 Donal Óg O'Donnell, 1258-1281
 Turlough (Toirdhealbhach) O'Donnell (sone of a daughter of Angus Mor Macdonald, Lord of the Isles), 1290–91
 Turlogh O'Donnell (Tairrdelbach an Fhiona Ó Domhnaill), 1380-1422
 Niall Garve O'Donnell, 1422-1439
 Naughton O'Donnell (Neachtan Ó Domhnaill), 1439-1452
 Hugh Roe O'Donnell, 1461-1505
 Hugh Duff O'Donnell (Aodh Dubh Ó Domhnaill), 1505-1537 
Manus O'Donnell (d. 1564)
Calvagh O'Donnell (d. 1566)
Sir Hugh O'Donnell (d. 1600)
Hugh Roe O'Donnell (d. 1602)
Rory O'Donnell, 1st Earl of Tyrconnell (d. 1608)

References

Further reading

 Annals of Ulster University College Cork
 Annals of Tigernach University College Cork
 Byrne, Francis John (2001), Irish Kings and High-Kings, Dublin: Four Courts Press, 
 Charles-Edwards, T. M. (2000), Early Christian Ireland, Cambridge: Cambridge University Press,  
 Mac Niocaill, Gearoid (1972), Ireland before the Vikings, Dublin: Gill and Macmillan

O'Donnell dynasty
Tir Connaill